Tanja Schärer (born 17 June 1989 in Schlieren) is a Swiss freestyle skier, specializing in aerials .

Schärer competed at the 2010 Winter Olympics for Switzerland. She placed 19th in the qualifying round of the aerials, failing to advance to the final.

As of April 2013, her best showing at the World Championships is 7th, in 2013.

Schärer made her World Cup debut in March 2008. As of April 2013, she has three World Cup podium finish, with her best finish a silver at Minsk in 2011/12. Her best World Cup overall finish in aerials is 5th, in 2011/12.

World Cup Podiums

References

1989 births
Living people
Olympic freestyle skiers of Switzerland
Freestyle skiers at the 2010 Winter Olympics
Freestyle skiers at the 2014 Winter Olympics
People from Schlieren, Switzerland
Swiss female freestyle skiers
Sportspeople from the canton of Zürich
21st-century Swiss women